The Hon. Sir William Stuart,  (3 March 1824 – 1 April 1896) was a British diplomat who served as Minister to Argentina, Greece and The Netherlands.

Early life
William Stuart was the third son of General Robert Walter Stuart, 11th Lord Blantyre and the former Fanny Mary Rodney, a daughter of Capt. Hon. John Rodney (son of Admiral George Rodney, 1st Baron Rodney). His older brother was Charles Stuart, 12th Lord Blantyre who married Evelyn, the second daughter of George Sutherland-Leveson-Gower, 2nd Duke of Sutherland.
 
He was educated at Eton College and Trinity College, Cambridge.

Career
He entered the Diplomatic Service in 1845 as unpaid attaché in Paris, and continued unpaid for six years until 1851. In 1856 it fell to Stuart (by then with the rank of First Attaché at Paris) to carry back to London the Ratification, signed by the monarchs of the participating countries, of the Treaty of Paris (1856).

In 1856 Stuart began a series of posts as Secretary of Legation, first at Rio de Janeiro, then at Naples from 1859 until February 1861 when King Francis II was overthrown and the British legation at Naples was closed. Stuart was then appointed to Athens in October 1861, to Washington, D.C. in October 1862, to Constantinople in 1864 and to St Petersburg in 1866.

In 1868 Stuart was appointed Minister to the Argentine Republic, although in March 1871 he was in London acting as Protocolist to a conference on the European Commission of the Danube, when he was awarded the CB. In 1872 he was appointed to be Minister to Greece, and in 1877 to his final post as Minister to the Netherlands and Luxembourg. His duties there included negotiation of a bilateral treaty between Great Britain and Luxembourg on the extradition of criminals in 1880 (superseded by later European conventions, currently the European Arrest Warrant), and the North Sea Fisheries Convention of 1882. While at The Hague he was knighted a Knight Commander of the Order of St Michael and St George (KCMG) in the Queen's Birthday Honours of 1886. He retired in 1888.

Personal life
Stuart married Georgina Tremenheere (1848–1901), the eldest daughter of Maj.-Gen. G. B. Tremenheere.

Sir William died 1 April 1896. Lady Stuart died, aged 52, on 3 January 1901.

References

External links
Catalogue of the Papers of Sir Andrew Buchanan, University of Nottingham
Sir William Stuart: Papers – The National Archives
Bolton Churchyard, East Lothian – The Scottish War Graves Project

1824 births
1896 deaths
People educated at Eton College
Alumni of Trinity College, Cambridge
Ambassadors of the United Kingdom to Argentina
Ambassadors of the United Kingdom to Greece
Ambassadors of the United Kingdom to the Netherlands
Knights Commander of the Order of St Michael and St George
Companions of the Order of the Bath